"10538 Overture" is the debut single by Electric Light Orchestra (ELO), released in 1972.

History

The song, written by Jeff Lynne, was first recorded as an intended B-side for a single by the Move, Lynne's previous group.  Both Roy Wood and Lynne sang on it, as happened later with The Move's "California Man". The song is about an escaped prisoner; Lynne wanted to give the character in the song a number, as opposed to a name, and he chanced upon the number 1053 while looking at the mixing console. Wood suggested adding an "8" to fit the melody better. Although intended to be a song for The Move, after cello parts were added it became the Electric Light Orchestra's first release. It was during the single's chart run that Wood left ELO, emerging later in the year with a new band called Wizzard.

Quotes

B-side
The B-side to "10538 Overture" was "First Movement (Jumping Biz)", an instrumental by Wood. The song first appeared on the band's debut album The Electric Light Orchestra in 1971 and features Wood on classical guitar, oboe and cello. Wood has apparently acknowledged that "First Movement (Jumping Biz)" was inspired by the 1968 song "Classical Gas".

"10538 Overture" became a B-side itself when a live version was released as the flip side of "Evil Woman" in 1975; containing elements of "Do Ya" The Electric Light Orchestra, later to become a track in its own right on "A New World Record"

Chart history

Jeff Lynne version

Jeff Lynne re-recorded the song in his own home studio. It was released on a compilation album with other re-recorded ELO songs, under the ELO name.

Covers and other uses
The song was covered by Bobby Sutliff and Mitch Easter in 2001 for the Jeff Lynne tribute album Lynne Me Your Ears, by Parthenon Huxley in 2005, and by Def Leppard in 2006 on their cover album Yeah! The song's main guitar riff was also 'sampled' by Paul Weller for his 1995 song "The Changingman". The song was also featured in the 2013 film American Hustle.

References

Electric Light Orchestra songs
Song recordings produced by Roy Wood
Song recordings produced by Jeff Lynne
1972 debut singles
1972 songs
Songs written by Jeff Lynne
Harvest Records singles